Carientothrips is a genus of thrips in the family Phlaeothripidae.

Species
 Carientothrips acti
 Carientothrips alienatus
 Carientothrips biformis
 Carientothrips calami
 Carientothrips casuarinae
 Carientothrips denticulatus
 Carientothrips fijiensis
 Carientothrips flavitibia
 Carientothrips grayi
 Carientothrips horni
 Carientothrips japonicus
 Carientothrips loisthus
 Carientothrips magnetis
 Carientothrips miskoi
 Carientothrips mjobergi
 Carientothrips palumai
 Carientothrips pedicillus
 Carientothrips pictilis
 Carientothrips reedi
 Carientothrips semirufus
 Carientothrips snowi
 Carientothrips tasmanica
 Carientothrips vesper

References

Phlaeothripidae
Thrips
Thrips genera